Løvenborg is a manor house and estate at Holbæk, Denmark.

History

Ellinge 
Bishop Absalon owned a village called Ellinge at the site. He ceded it to Sorø Abbey in exchange for land elsewhere and it was later passed to Roskilde bishopric. Ellinge was at some point transformed into a manor which was the centre of a relatively small fief. In 1370, it comprised two farms and 14 smallholdings. The feudal lords of the estate included Jakob Mogensen and Jep Nielsen of the  Ravensberg family and then for several generations members of the Jernskæg.
Ellinge was confiscated by the Crown after the Reformation in 1536. It remained a fief until 1547.

Birkholm
The new owner was the Pomeranian nobleman Hans Barnekow who was at the same time recognized as Danish nobility. The agreement obliged him to settle in Denmark and take a Danish wife. He married Mette Oxe in 1550. Barnekow changed the name of the estate to Birkholm. Hans Barnekow's widow stayed on the estate after his death in 1559. She continued the process that her husband had started with concentrating the land closer to the manor. In 1582, the estate was ceded to their son Johan Barnekow after his two elder brothers had passed away. He also inherited the family's estates on Rugen.

After Johan Barnekow's death in 1603, the estates were passed on to his brother Christian Barnekow. He had studied abroad as was normal for young noblemen at the time but his grand tour had lasted an unusual 17 years. He studied at several European universities but had also visited Turkey, yuria, Egypt and Ethiopia. Christian Barnekow died in 1612. His widow Margrethe Brahe Barnekow    (1584-1617) then managed the estate until their son  Ove Barnekow  was old enough to take over the operation  following her death in 1617. Ove Barnekow  died young in 1629. Hans Barnekow, who inherited the estate, sold shortly thereafter. His brother Hans Barnekow founded the Swedish branch of the  Barnekow  family. 

The next owner was Malte Juul, the owner of Jessinggaard and Maltesholm. He has previously served both as hofunker and Valet de chambre (kammerjunker) but had also been feudal lord of Christianopel (Oslo) in Norway. He became a member of rigsrådet in 1647 but died the following year. His widow Anne Juul née Ramel took over Birkholm. She outlived their only son and the estate was therefore passed on to her youngest daughter, Margrethe's husband, Mouritz Podebusk. He was one of the first men in the country to be created   Baron (Freiherr) and established the Barony of Einsiedelsborg in 1676. Birkholm was not part of the barony and was instead sold to Frederik Vittinghof Scheel. He established the Barony of Scheelenborg in 1680. Vittinghof Scheel increased the size of Birkholm. After his death the estate was endowed to his son-in-law baron Schack von Brockdorff. After his death in 1731 the estate was sold in auction. It was purchased by his wife, Sophie Charlotte, who ceded it to their son, Frederik von Brockdorff. He pledged the estate in 1735 and was forced to sold in auction in 1738.

Løvenskiold family
 
The buyer was Herman Leopoldus, a timber merchant and shipowner from Skien-Porsgrund in Norway. He had already purchased Aggersvold at Hjembæk, in 1737. In 1738, he was ennobled under the name Løvenskiold. He died in 1750. Severin Løvenskiold (1777–1856) a son by his second wife, inherited Birkholm and Aggersvold as well as several iron works in Norway.
Severin Løvenskiold had served in the Royal Lige Guards and was just 24 years old appointed to konferensråd. In 1749 he married Magdalene Charlotte Hedevig von Numsen, a daughter of the General War Commissioner. Severin Løvenskiold established a stamhus under the name  Løvenborg from Birkholm and Vognserup in 1766. The stamhus was turned into a barony in  1773.

 
Severin Løvenskiold's widow, Magdalene Charlotte Hedevig von Numsen, owned the Løvenborg estate after her husband's death in 1776. The estate was supposedly used for secret negotiations by foreign minister A.P. Bernstorff in connection with crown prince Frederick's (Frederik VI) seizure of power. In 1789, Magdalene Charlotte Hedevig von Numsen ceded Løvenborg to her only son, Michael Herman Løvenskiold. He implemented the agricultural reforms of the time on the estate by selling the tenant farms to the copyholders. This process was completed in 1802.

Carl Michael Herman Løvenskiold's eldest son,  Carl Løvenskiold, inherited the barony in 1807. His son, Herman Løvenskiold, inherited the estate in 1821. He led a quiet life on the estate. He was very interested in music and several of his compositions were published under the pseudonym  Fridolin Carlsen. After his death in 1877, Løvenborg was passed on to his son Herman Frederik Løvenskiold. The estate was the following year placed under administration by a legal guardian since Løvenskiold was deemed mentally ill. He objected several times but in vain and ended up moving to Vejle where he made a living as a plumber.

Ahlefeldt-Laurvig
After his death in 1917, Løvenborg was passed on to his nephew Carl Løvenskiold. The barony was dissolved in 1921 as a result of the lensafkøsningsloven of 1919. Part of the land was sold off in lots to be able to pay the fee to the state and Vognserup was sold in 1921. After Carl Løvenskiold's death in 1938, Løvenborg was sold to count Christian Carl Ahlefeldt-Laurvig.

Cultural references
Løvenborg has been used as a location in the films Komtessen paa Steenholt (1939), Jeppe på bjerget (1981) and Jydekompagniet (1988). It was also used as a location in the DT television series Gøngehøvdingen'' (1992).

List of owners
 (      -1536)    Bishopric of Roskilde
 (1536-1547)    The Crown
 (1547-1559)    Hans Barnekow
 (1559-1582)    Mette Oxe, gift Barnekow
 (1582-1603)    Johan Barnekow
 (1603-1612)    Christian Barnekow
 (1612-1617)    Margrethe Brahe, gift Barnekow
 (1617-1629)    Ove Barnekow
 (1629-1630)    Hans Barnekow
 (1630-1648)    Malte Juul
 (1648-1661)    Anne Ramel, gift Juul
 (1661-1684)    Mouritz Podebusk
 (1684-1691)    Frederik Vittinghof  Scheel
 (1691-1731)    Schack von Brockdorff
 (1731-1732)    Sophie Charlotte Vittinghof, gift von Brockdorff
 (1732-1735)    Frederik von Brockdorff
 (1735-      )    Frederik von Mösting
 (      -1738)    Arvinger efter Frederik von Mösting
 (1738-1750)    Herman Leopoldus Løvenskiold
 (1750-1776)    Severin Løvenskiold
 (1776-1789)    Magdalene Charlotte Hedevig v. Numsen, gift Løvenskiold
 (1789-1807)    Carl Michael Herman Løvenskiold
 (1807-1831)    Carl Løvenskiold
 (1831-1877)    Herman Løvenskiold
 (1877-1917)    Herman Frederik Løvenskiold
 (1917-1938)    Carl Løvenskiold
 (1938-      )    Christian Carl Ahlefeldt-Laurvig
 (1989-      )    Christian Knud Ahlefeldt-Laurvig

References

External  links
Løvenborg Gods

Manor houses in Holbæk Municipality
Listed buildings and structures in Holbæk Municipality
Listed castles and manor houses in Denmark
Barnekow family
Buildings and structures associated with the Ahlefeldt family